Zhangixalus owstoni or Owston's green tree frog is a species of frog in the family Rhacophoridae endemic to Japan. Its natural habitats are subtropical or tropical moist lowland forests, subtropical or tropical seasonally wet or flooded lowland grassland, intermittent freshwater marshes, and irrigated land. It is threatened by habitat loss. The population is currently stable.

References

External links

Endemic amphibians of Japan
owstoni
Taxonomy articles created by Polbot
Amphibians described in 1907